Thomas Mork (born 22 June 1978) is a Norwegian former footballer who currently works as a coach for Molde FK's academy and as a coach for Molde 2. Mork spent his entire top-level playing career at Molde, where his primary position was on the left wing. He made his first-team debut for Molde in 1997, and played for the club until 2008, when his contract was not renewed. He was also capped 13 times by Norway U21.

Honours
Molde FK
Norwegian Cup: 2005

External links 
  Player profile on official club website
  National Caps

1978 births
Living people
Norwegian footballers
Norway under-21 international footballers
Molde FK players
Eliteserien players
Norwegian First Division players
Association football midfielders
Molde FK non-playing staff
People from Averøy
Sportspeople from Møre og Romsdal